Mercury Glacier is a wide glacier flowing south from the slopes of Mount Hughes in the Cook Mountains of Antarctica. It was named by the New Zealand Antarctic Place-Names Committee after Mercury, a god in Greek mythology, in association with other names in this area.

References

Glaciers of Oates Land